Kerala Police football team is an Indian institutional football team based in Thiruvananthapuram, Kerala that competes in the Kerala Premier League. It is the first and only team from Kerala to win India's top domestic cup competition.

History
In 1984, the then Kerala Director General of Police (DGP) thought it would be a good idea to form a football team for the police department. He not only realized the potential of the talent pool available in the state but also wanted to try and bring in a positive image in the minds of the people of the state when they think of the department.

The Kerala Police Football Team, is governed by the Kerala Police and won  the Federation Cup twice. In 1996-97 they participated in the inaugural edition of National Football League.
In 1998 they took part in the first edition of NFL 2nd Division. Over the years they played several times in the Federation Cup and Durand Cup. In 2014-15 they reached the Final of Kerala Premier League but were defeated by SBT. In 2019-20 they reached the semifinal of Kerala Premier League.

Honours
Federation Cup
Winners (2): 1990, 1991
Kerala State Club Football Championship
Winners (6): 1985, 1987,1995, 1998, 2014, 2016
Runners-up (5): 1990, 1993, 1994, 1996, 2013
 Mohan Kumar Mangalam Football Tournament
Winners (1): 2017
 DCM Trophy
 Runners-up (1): 1954

Statistics and records

Key
Pos. = Position in league
Attendance/G = Average league attendance

See also
 Football in Kerala
 National Football League (India)
 Kerala Premier League
 List of football clubs in India

References

Football clubs in Kerala
Police association football clubs in India
Kerala Police